Blechnum appendiculatum is a fern in the family Blechnaceae. Its native range is from the southern United States through Mexico, the Caribbean and Central America to western South America.

References

Blechnaceae
Flora of the Caribbean
Flora of Central America
Flora of Mexico
Flora of northern South America
Flora of the South-Central United States
Flora of the Southeastern United States
Flora of western South America
Flora without expected TNC conservation status